(born 18 June 1959) is a Japanese-born Australian chef based in Sydney. He appeared as the leading judge in the final episode of the second season of Junior MasterChef Australia.

Background

Early life
Tetsuya Wakuda was born on June 18, 1959, in the city of Hamamatsu in Shizuoka Prefecture, Japan. Wakuda made his first visit to Australia at the age of 22.

Kinsela's and beyond (1983–1989)
In 1983, Wakuda met Sydney chef Tony Bilson (later head chef of Bilson's restaurant), who offered him a job preparing sushi at Kinsela's in Taylor Square. Under Bilson, Wakuda learned many of the classical French techniques that underpin much of Wakuda's Japanese-French fusion cooking. Wakuda says of his time at Kinsela's, it "was where I realised I wanted to, and discovered that I could, cook. It was where I started learning classical French technique. I made up a lot of things along the way, and luckily for me, people liked the way it tasted."

Wakuda left Kinsela's in 1983, and together with one of the restaurant's managers set up Rose's nightclub, where Wakuda worked as a chef for a year. After leaving, he was introduced to chef Hans Mohr through the late restaurateur Anders Ousback. He worked as a second chef with Mohr for six months.

Wakuda turned his attention to starting a new restaurant of his own together with his wife. He chose a tiny shopfront in the suburb of Rozelle as the location.

Tetsuya's restaurant

Rozelle years (1989–2000)
Tetsuya's opened in 1989, in Sydney's inner-west suburb of Rozelle.  In 1992 The Sydney Morning Herald Good Food Guide awarded the restaurant Three Hats.

The restaurant was remodelled in 1993, increasing seats to 65, with an expanded and re-fitted kitchen. In November 2000 Tetsuya's moved to a larger location in Sydney's CBD.

Awards

Tetsuya was given an Order of Australia medal in The Queen's Birthday 2005 Honours List "For service to the community and the development of Australian cuisine as a chef, restaurateur and author, to vocational training and to support for charitable groups."

Tetsuya's Confit of Ocean Trout has been described as the "most photographed dish in the world".
Charlie Trotter said: "Tetsuya is part of an elite group of international chefs, that has influenced other chefs through their personal styles and unique approaches to food. His culinary philosophy centers on pure, clean flavours that are decisive, yet completely refined. His amazing technique, Asian heritage, sincere humility, worldwide travels and insatiable curiosity combine to create incredible, soulful dishes that exude passion in every bite."

Waku Ghin restaurant
In 2010, Tetsuya's second restaurant, Waku Ghin, opened in Singapore at Marina Bay Sands with an offering of a 10-course tasting menu. In 2015, it was listed as #70 on The World's 50 Best Restaurants. It was subsequently awarded one Michelin star in the inaugural 2016 Singapore edition of the Michelin Guide and then two Michelin stars in 2017. It has maintained its two-star rating since 2017.

References

External links

 Tetsuya's Tetsuya's Restaurant website
 Waku Ghin restaurant website

1959 births
Living people
Japanese chefs
Australian chefs
Australian restaurateurs
Japanese emigrants to Australia
People from Hamamatsu